Charles Michael Baker (18 June 1880 – 4 May 1962) was an Australian rules footballer who played in the Victorian Football League (VFL).

Recruited from St Patrick's College, Ballarat, he played 76 games for St Kilda from 1902–1906, and kicked 122 goals, including four of which came in his first VFL game; at the time a club record. He represented Victoria in cricket from 1903-1905 and at football before an injury ended his career.

Baker won the Leading Goalkicker Medal in 1902, a season in which St Kilda kicked only 64 goals for the year (of which Baker kicked 46.9%) and finished last without winning a match, a VFL/AFL record seven matches behind second-last placed Geelong. Baker's proportion of his team's goals is also an VFL/AFL record.

See also
 List of Victoria first-class cricketers

References

Cricinfo profile

1880 births
St Kilda Football Club players
Victoria cricketers
VFL Leading Goalkicker Medal winners
Australian rules footballers from Ballarat
1962 deaths